The 2015 Dow Corning Tennis Classic was a professional tennis tournament played on indoor hard courts. It was the twenty-first edition of the tournament which is part of the 2015 ITF Women's Circuit, offering a total of $100,000 in prize money. It took place in Midland, Michigan, United States, on 2–8 February 2015.

Singles entrants

Seeds 

 1 Rankings as of 19 January 2015

Other entrants 
The following players received wildcards into the singles main draw:
  Sara Daavettila
  Caroline Dolehide
  Lauren Embree

The following players received entry from the qualifying draw:
  Naomi Cavaday
  Danielle Lao
  Alexandra Stevenson
  Nicole Vaidišová

The following player received entry from a protected ranking:
  Jessica Pegula

Champions

Singles 

  Tatjana Maria def.  Louisa Chirico, 6–2, 6–0

Doubles 

  Julie Coin /  Emily Webley-Smith def.  Jacqueline Cako /  Sachia Vickery, 4–6, 7–6(7–4), [11–9]

External links 
 2015 Dow Corning Tennis Classic at ITFtennis.com
 

2015 ITF Women's Circuit
2015 in American tennis
2015
2015 in sports in Michigan